Neuropeptide Y receptor type 1 is a protein that in humans is encoded by the NPY1R gene.

Selective ligands

Agonists 
 Neuropeptide Y (endogenous agonist, non subtype selective)
 Peptide YY

Antagonists 
Peptide
 BVD-10 (selective NPY1 antagonist, CAS# 262418-00-8)
 GR-231,118 (mixed NPY1 antagonist / NPY4 agonist, CAS# 158859-98-4)

Non-peptide
 BIBO-3304 (CAS# 191868-14-1)
 BIBP-3226 (CAS# 159013-54-4)
 PD-160,170 (CAS# 181468-88-2)

Available Structures 

 5ZBH (Neuropeptide Y1 bound to antagonist BMS-193835)
 5ZBQ (Neuropeptide Y1 bound to antagonist UR-MK299)

See also 
 Neuropeptide Y receptor

References

Further reading

External links 
 
 

G protein-coupled receptors